Discoverer 2 was an American optical reconnaissance satellite launched on 13 April 1959 at 21:18:39 GMT, the second of three test flights of the Corona KH-1 spy satellite series. Discoverer 2 was the first satellite to be stabilized in orbit in all three axes and to be maneuvered on command from the earth. Though it carried no film and thus conducted no surveillance, Discoverer 2 was both the first satellite equipped with a reentry capsule and the first to return a payload from orbit. A timing error caused the reentry capsule to land near the island of Spitsbergen, Norway, rather than Hawaii. A joint US-Norway recovery operation was mounted, but was unsuccessful, and there was fear that the capsule ended in the possession of the Soviet Union. Such claims have never been verified. The flight and loss of Discoverer 2 was the inspiration for the book and film Ice Station Zebra.

Background

"Discoverer" was the civilian designation and cover for the Corona satellite photo-reconnaissance series of satellites managed by the Advanced Research Projects Agency of the Department of Defense and the U.S. Air Force. The primary goal of the satellites was to replace the U-2 spyplane in surveilling the Sino-Soviet Bloc, determining the disposition and speed of production of Soviet missiles and long-range bombers assess. The Corona program was also used to produce maps and charts for the Department of Defense and other US government mapping programs.

The first series of Corona satellites were the Keyhole 1 (KH-1) satellites based on the Agena-A upper stage, which not only offered housing but whose engine provided attitude control in orbit. The KH-1 payload included the C (for Corona) single, vertical-looking, panoramic camera that scanned back and forth, exposing its film at a right angle to the line of flight. Film was returned from orbit by a single General Electric Satellite Return Vehicle (SRV) constructed by General Electric. The SRV was equipped with an onboard small solid-fuel retro motor to deorbit at the end of the mission. Recovery of the capsule was done in mid-air by a specially equipped aircraft.

Discoverer 2 was the second in a series of three camera-less test flights preceding operational KH-1 flights. Its immediate predecessor, Discoverer 1, which carried neither camera nor film capsule, was launched 28 February 1959 after a failed attempt on 21 January 1959.

Spacecraft

After orbital insertion, the satellite and SRV together massed  after orbit insertion.

Instead of a camera and film, Discoverer 2's recovery package included cosmic-ray film packs to determine the intensity and composition of cosmic radiation. This emulsion experiment comprised two groups of films arranged horizontally and vertically to measure the intensity and direction of cosmic radiation and to distinguish among electrons, protons, and heavier charged particles. A metallic Bismuth detector was designed to register induced changes in its sensors from which changes in neutral density could be derived to prevent overexposure in later, photographic missions.

In addition, the spacecraft carried test life support equipment and a "mechanical mouse," a small biomedical payload.

The capsule was designed to be recovered by a specially equipped aircraft during parachute descent, but was also designed to float to permit recovery from the ocean. The main spacecraft contained a telemetry transmitter and a tracking beacon. The telemetry could transmit over 100 measurements of the spacecraft performance, including 28 environmental, 34 guidance and control, 18 second stage performance, 15 communications, and 9 reentry capsule parameters. Electrical power for all instruments was provided by NiCd batteries. Orientation was provided by a cold nitrogen gas jet-stream system, a scanner for pitch attitude, and an inertial reference package for yaw and roll data.

Mission

Launched on 13 April 1959 at 21:18:39 GMT from Vandenberg LC 75-3-4 into a  x  polar orbit by a Thor-Agena A booster, Discoverer 2 was three-axis stabilized and was commanded from Earth. After 17 orbits, on 14 April 1959, a reentry vehicle was ejected. The reentry vehicle separated into two sections, one consisting of the protection equipment, retrorocket and main structure and the other the reentry capsule. It was planned that the capsule would reenter over the vicinity of Hawaii for recovery, but a timer malfunction caused by human programming error premature capsule ejection and reentry near the Norwegian island of Spitsbergen, whose residents observed both the SRV's fiery descent as well as its colorful parachute.

Though Norway was a Western ally and a member of NATO, the Soviet Union, which shared a border with the Scandinavian country, had a lease to operate several mining facilities on the island. The Air Force was thus vague when it announced that the Hawaiian capsule recovery had been canceled and that, instead, the SRV would be picked up somewhere in "the arctic."

With the aid of Norwegian troops, the Air Force mounted an intensive search for the SRV but was unable to find it, and the search was called off on April 22. At least one post-action memo reported evidence that Discoverer 2's capsule had fallen into the possession of the Soviet Union (ski tracks near the impact zone), which could have provided limited intelligence to the Soviet government. This memo has been disputed, and the fate of Discovery 2's SRV remained unknown as of 1998. The incident became the basis for the book and movie Ice Station Zebra.

Though the SRV recovery was a failure, Discoverer 2 was the first satellite to be stabilized in orbit in all three axes, to be maneuvered on command from the earth, to separate a reentry vehicle on command, and to send its reentry vehicle back to earth. The main instrumentation payload remained in orbit and carried out vehicular performance and communications tests, successfully gathering data on propulsion, communications, orbital performance, and stabilization. All equipment functioned as programmed except the timing device. Satellite telemetry functioned until April 14, 1959, and the main tracking beacon functioned until April 21, 1959. The satellite bus reentered on 26 April 1959.

Legacy

CORONA began operational flights on 25 Jun 1959 with the launch of Discoverer 4 and achieved its first fully successful flight with the mission of Discoverer 14, launched on August 18, 1960. The program ultimately comprised 145 flights in eight satellite series, the last mission launching on 25 May 1972. CORONA was declassified in 1995, and a formal acknowledgement of the existence of US reconnaissance programs, past and present, was issued in September 1996.

References

Spacecraft launched in 1959
Spacecraft which reentered in 1959